Vercurago is a comune (municipality) in the Province of Lecco in the Italian region Lombardy, located about  northeast of Milan and about  southeast of Lecco.

Vercurago borders the following municipalities: Calolziocorte, Erve, Garlate, Lecco, Olginate.

References

External links
Official website

Cities and towns in Lombardy